Callinectes danae is a species of swimming crab. The species is common in Brazil and the West Indies.

References

Portunoidea
Crustaceans of the Atlantic Ocean
Crustaceans described in 1869
Taxa named by Sidney Irving Smith